Ollie's Pack is a Canadian animated action comedy TV series created by Pedro Eboli and Graham Peterson. It was produced by Nelvana and aired on YTV in Canada. In the United States, it premiered on Nickelodeon on April 6, 2020. The final few episodes aired on Nicktoons from May 3 to 6, 2021.

Characters 
 Ollie (voiced by James Hartnett)
 Cleo (voiced by Ana Sani)
 Bernie (voiced by David Berni)

Production 
The series originated from a short titled Monster Pack, created as part of the annual Nickelodeon Animated Shorts Program. On March 2, 2020, Nickelodeon announced that the series would premiere in April 2020. Pedro Eboli and Graham Peterson created the series.

The 26-episode action-comedy series was produced by Nelvana. On March 30, 2020, it was announced that the series would premiere on April 6, 2020.

Episodes 
All episodes were directed by Adrian Thatcher.

Broadcast 
In Canada, the series premiered on YTV on September 5, 2020.

Ratings 
 
}}

Awards and nominations 
In 2021, Corus received a Canadian Screen Award nomination for the show.

References

External links 
 
 

2020 Canadian television series debuts
2021 Canadian television series endings
2020s Canadian animated television series
2020s Canadian children's television series
English-language television shows

Canadian children's animated action television series
Canadian children's animated comic science fiction television series
Canadian children's animated science fantasy television series
Middle school television series
Television series by Nelvana
Animated television series about children
Television series about monsters
YTV (Canadian TV channel) original programming